This article lists political parties in Mozambique.

Mozambique has a two-party system, which means that there are two dominant political parties, with difficulty for anybody to achieve electoral success under the banner of any other party.

Active parties

Parties represented in parliament

Other parties 
 Independent Alliance of Mozambique (Aliança Independente de Moçambique)
 Mozambican Nationalist Movement (Movimento Nacionalista Moçambicano)
 National Convention Party (Partido de Convenção Nacional)  
 National Unity Party (Partido de Unidade Nacional)
 Liberal Front (Frente Liberal)
 Front of Patriotic Action (Frente de Ação Patriotica)
 People's Party of Mozambique (Partido Popular de Moçambique)
 United Front of Mozambique (Frente Unida de Moçambique)  
 Party for Peace, Democracy, and Development (Partido para a Paz, Democracia e Desenvolvimento)
 Independent Party of Mozambique (Partido Independente de Moçambique)
 Liberal Democratic Party of Mozambique (Partido Liberal e Democrático de Moçambique)
 Mozambique Social Broadening Party
 National Reconciliation Party
 Party of Freedom and Solidarity 
 Social Liberal and Democratic Party (Partido Social-Liberal e Democrático)
 Greens Party of Mozambique (Partido dos Verdes de Moçambique)

Defunct parties

 Communist Party of Mozambique (Partido Comunista de Moçambique)
 National Democratic Union of Mozambique (União Democrática Nacional de Moçambique)
 Revolutionary Party of Mozambique (PRM; Partido Revolucionário de Moçambique)

See also 
 Politics of Mozambique
 List of ruling political parties by country

Mozambique
 
Political parties
Political parties
Mozambique